Nechayevsky may refer to:

Nechayevsky, Republic of Adygea, a khutor (village) in the Republic of Adygea, Russia
Nechayevsky, name of several other rural localities in Russia